Rosa Chumbe is a 2015 Peruvian drama film directed by Jonatan Relayze. It was selected as the Peruvian entry for the Best Foreign Language Film at the 90th Academy Awards, but it was not nominated.

Plot
A policewoman in Lima cares for her grandson after her daughter steals her mother's savings and leaves her baby behind.

Cast
 Liliana Trujillo as Rosa Chumbe
 Cindy Díaz as Sheyla

See also
 List of submissions to the 90th Academy Awards for Best Foreign Language Film
 List of Peruvian submissions for the Academy Award for Best Foreign Language Film

References

External links
 

2015 films
2015 drama films
Peruvian drama films
2010s Peruvian films
2010s Spanish-language films